Andrea Thomas (born 3 August 1968 in Clarendon Park, Clarendon, Jamaica) is a retired Jamaican athlete who competed in the 1984 and 1988 Olympics.

In 1985, she  was awarded the Austin Sealy Trophy for the
most outstanding athlete of the 1985 CARIFTA Games.

International competitions

References

1968 births
Living people
People from Clarendon Parish, Jamaica
Jamaican female sprinters
Jamaican female middle-distance runners
Athletes (track and field) at the 1984 Summer Olympics
Athletes (track and field) at the 1988 Summer Olympics
Olympic athletes of Jamaica
Olympic female sprinters
20th-century Jamaican women
21st-century Jamaican women